Takayoshi (written: , , , , , , , , , , , ,  or ) is a masculine Japanese given name. Notable people with the name include:

 (born 1969), Japanese footballer and manager
 (1942–2010), Japanese sumo wrestler
 (1539–1600), Japanese samurai
 (born 1992), Japanese footballer
, Japanese swimmer
, Japanese baseball player
 (born 1949), Japanese long jumper
 (1833–1877), Japanese samurai and politician
 (1945–2012), Japanese karateka
 (born 1983), Japanese musician
 (born 1978), Japanese footballer
 (born 1977), Japanese footballer
 (born 1949), Japanese politician
 (born 1975), Japanese singer
 (born 1979), Japanese footballer
 (born 1955), Japanese footballer
 (1909–1984), Japanese sprinter

Japanese masculine given names